St. Helena Parish is a parish in the U.S. state of Louisiana. At the 2020 United States census, the population was 10,920. Its seat is Greensburg. The parish was created in 1810. St. Helena Parish is part of the Baton Rouge metropolitan area.

History
The parish is one of the eight Florida Parishes, a region which was once part of colonial West Florida. The area was annexed to the Territory of Orleans in 1810, after the short-lived Republic of West Florida capitulated to the United States.

In 1832, the southern section of the parish was taken to form Livingston Parish and the St. Helena parish seat was redesignated as Greensburg, where it remains today. St. Helena lost another portion of land in 1866, which was subsequently added to land from other parishes to form Tangipahoa Parish.

From 1964 to 1984, St. Helena Parish was represented in the Louisiana State Senate by the Democrat businessman W. E. "Bill" Dykes. In 1983, as a casualty of redistricting, Dykes bowed out of contention in a race which would have pitted him against long-term Senate President Sixty Rayburn of Bogalusa, Louisiana. Rayburn himself lost his senate seat in 1995.

In recent years, St. Helena experienced a series of scandals involving parish officials. In 1997, Sheriff Eugene Holland (13 October 1954 – 14 December 2010) was found guilty of misuse of government funds and property and using prison inmates for personal labor; he spent time in prison as a result. His replacement, Chaney L. Phillips (born ), served for only a year as sheriff before he was convicted of fraud and money laundering that he had committed while serving as the parish assessor. He was given an eight-year prison sentence on conviction in 1998 of having placed a political supporter on his assessor office staff; the individual performed no duties. Phillips was assigned to the Federal Correctional Institution in Englewood, Colorado. He was released on May 23, 2003.

Ronald "Gun" Ficklin, former mayor of Greensburg, took over the sheriff's office from Phillips in 1998, but on February 5, 2007, Ficklin himself pleaded guilty on multiple counts involving his role in operating "chop shops" — reselling stolen automobiles and parts — using state prisoners to staff these activities and as a pit crew for his race car. Ficklin died of cancer while in prison (21 October 2011).

In 2007, Nat Williams was elected as Ficklin's replacement, the first African American to hold the office in that parish.

Geography
It is located in the northern tier of the Florida Parishes, and within the Baton Rouge metropolitan area.

Major highways

  Louisiana Highway 10
  Louisiana Highway 16
  Louisiana Highway 37
  Louisiana Highway 38
  Louisiana Highway 43
  Louisiana Highway 441

Adjacent parishes and counties

 Amite County, Mississippi – north
 Tangipahoa Parish – east
 Livingston Parish – south
 East Baton Rouge Parish – southwest
 East Feliciana Parish – west

Communities

Town
 Greensburg (parish seat and largest municipality)

Village
 Montpelier

Unincorporated communities

 Chipola
 Coleman Town
 Darlington
 Easleyville
 Grangeville
 Hillsdale
 Kedron
 Liverpool
 Pine Grove

Demographics

At the 2010 United States census, there were 11,203 people living in the parish, and at the 2000 U.S. census, there were 10,525 people. The 2019 American Community Survey estimated 10,297 people lived in the parish. The 2020 census tabulated a total of 10,920 residents. In 2019, there were 3,857 households, down from 3,873 at the 2000 census.

The racial and ethnic makeup at the 2019 census-estimates was 52.5% Black and African American, 45.7% non-Hispanic white, 1.1% American Indian and Alaska Native, 0.3% Asian, 0.2% some other race, and 0.2% multiracial; Hispanics and Latin Americans of any race made up 1.8% of the total population. In 2010, the racial and ethnic makeup was 53.3% Black and African American, 44.9% White American, 0.3% Native American, 0.1% Asian, 0.5% of some other race and 0.8% of two or more races; 0.9% were Hispanic and Latin American of any race.

Of the 3,857 households at the 2019 census-estimates, 78.7% were aged 18 and older, 5.4% aged 5 and under, and 18.9% aged 65 and older. The median age was 39.4, up from 35 at the 2000 census.

The parish had an employment rate of 45.9%, and the population was spread throughout 5,330 housing units. An estimated 78.9% of the population owned their housing units. The median value of an owner-occupied housing unit was $100,100, and the median gross rent was $656. The median income for a household in the parish was $43,886; males had a median income of $52,398 versus $31,003 for females. An estimated 24.3% of the parish population lived at or below the poverty line in 2019.

Education
The Elementary and High School in St. Helena Parish are part of the St. Helena Parish School System. The Middle School in St. Helena Parish is part of the Recovery School District of Louisiana. It is in the service area of Baton Rouge Community College.

Brushy Creek Crater
St. Helena Parish contains the only identified meteorite impact crater in the state of Louisiana. This suspected impact crater is a roughly circular depression about 1.2 miles/2 km in diameter. Shocked quartz and intensely fractured quartz have been recovered from fractured and possibly altered sediments comprising its rim. Its age is estimated to be between 11 and 30 ka. It lies about 5.8 miles/9.3 kilometers southwest of Greensburg, in the southwest corner of the parish. Louisiana Highway 37 cuts through the northern edge of this feature.

Politics

See also

 National Register of Historic Places listings in St. Helena Parish, Louisiana
 Robby Carter
 Doris Lindsey Holland Rhodes

References

External links
 St Helena Parish Police Jury
 Explore the History and Culture of Southeastern Louisiana at National Park Service

 
Saint Helena Parish, Louisiana
Baton Rouge metropolitan area
1810 establishments in the Territory of Orleans
Populated places established in 1810
Black Belt (U.S. region)
Majority-minority parishes in Louisiana